The French King Bridge is the three-span "cantilever arch" bridge that crosses the Connecticut River on the border between the towns of Erving and Gill, Massachusetts, United States.  The bridge, part of Massachusetts Route 2, carries automobile, bicycle, and pedestrian traffic and is owned and managed by the Massachusetts Department of Transportation (MassDOT).

History

The French King Bridge (FKB) was opened to traffic on September 10, 1932. It was named the "Most Beautiful Steel Bridge" of 1932 by the American Institute of Steel Construction. The bridge was rebuilt in 1992, and refurbished in 2008–2010.

Suicides
In 2009, police said that between 26 and 31 people were known to have jumped off the bridge since its construction in 1932, with only 2 survivors.

Name
The name comes from a nearby geographic feature named French King Rock, visible in the middle of the river.

Image gallery

See also
List of bridges documented by the Historic American Engineering Record in Massachusetts
List of crossings of the Connecticut River

References

External links

Massachusetts Highway Department: French King Bridge

Open-spandrel deck arch bridges in the United States
Bridges completed in 1932
Bridges over the Connecticut River
Bridges in Franklin County, Massachusetts
Historic American Engineering Record in Massachusetts
Road bridges in Massachusetts
Steel bridges in the United States
Cantilever bridges in the United States
Gill, Massachusetts